Dámaso Rodríguez Martín (December 11, 1944 – February 19, 1991), better known as El Brujo (The Warlock) or Maso, was a Spanish serial killer and rapist who, in 1991, was responsible for three murders in the Anaga mountain area in Tenerife, where he sought refuge after his escape from the Tenerife II Prison, where he was serving a sentence for a violation and one of his killings.

Following the murder of a German couple, "El Brujo" became the most wanted criminal by Spain's security forces. Due to the severity of his crimes and the media coverage surrounding them, Dámaso is regarded as the Canary Islands' most infamous killer.

Biography

Birth and early years
Dámaso Rodríguez Martín was born on December 11, 1944, in the place known as Las Montañas, in the village of El Batán (municipality of San Cristóbal de La Laguna, Tenerife, Spain). His parents were Martín Rodríguez Silveria and Celestina Martín Perdomo, and he had four brothers.

His family was very poor, but despite this, his parents tried to give him a good education. The young Rodríguez however started to perform criminal acts at a very young age. When he was just 17, he was accused of theft and arrested, and after his release a year later in September 1963, he joined the Spanish Legion and was sent to Western Sahara. In 1966, he graduated from the Spanish Legion.

Subsequently, Rodríguez went back to Tenerife, and in 1967 married Mercedes Martín Rodríguez and settled in a place known as El Peladero, in the village of Las Mercedes in San Cristóbal de La Laguna. In 1973, their first child would be born, and in 1975 - the second.

Murders and escape
He committed his first murder on November 11, 1981, when he killed a young man who was with his girlfriend in his Mazda, in the area of El Moquinal. Rodríguez was a voyeur who liked to watch couples having sex. He then killed the young man and beat and sexually assaulted the girl while her dead boyfriend's body was still in the vehicle. He then drove the body and the girl to "Llano de los Viejos", where he abandoned them.

Investigators from the National Police asked around the area about a violent individual, a "night stalker", who knew the mountains and also strolled about at night looking for couples. All information pointed to Dámaso Rodríguez. "El Brujo" was sentenced to 55 years in prison for murder, rape, theft of a firearm and unlawful possession of weapons. Rodríguez escaped from prison on January 17, 1991, and fled to the mountains of Anaga. Originally he moved home, with the intention of murdering his wife, because she had distanced herself from him while he was in prison. Although, he could not do it because she was accompanied by family and friends. Damaso moves to the mountains, waiting for the opportunity to assassinate his wife.

On January 23, the body of German tourist Karl Flick was found on the forest road leading to El Solís. The next day, at 3:15 PM, in a remote area of the Roque de El Moquinal, the Civil Guard recovered the body of his wife, Marta Küpper, who had obvious signs of strangulation. Everybody seemed to indicate that they had pled for their lives, but Rodríguez had no compassion. Speculations, sightings, the fugitive's escape at the last moment, robberies in caves and in the houses of hunters or farmers fed the legend of "El Brujo". Later, he would sexually assault another woman, a neighbor of the place.

These events overlapped the celebration of the Carnival of Santa Cruz de Tenerife of that year, mainly due to the fear that aroused among the people that the murderer would show up in a costume, and could easily escape.

Death
On February 19, a family moved to a house in the area near El Solís, only to find their door was forced open. They alerted the police, who dispatched two Civil Guards from Tacoronte, fronted by a sergeant commander, whom detected Rodríguez's presence in the home.

When the non-commissioned officer tried to enter, he was met with shotgun fire. The agent returned fire, shooting several times, but "El Brujo" had no intentions of surrendering. Instead, he opted to end his life, placing his hunting shotgun under his chin and firing using his toes. However, due to the length of the weapon, he survived. Subsequently, there was another exchange between the officer and Rodríguez, whom successfully killed himself in the second encounter.

In popular culture
 In 2003, the Televisión Canaria premiered a series entitled "Noche del Crimen" that reconstructs the most famous crimes that have taken place in the Canary Islands in recent years. The series was directed by the Canarian filmmaker Javier Caldas. One of the episodes of the series was dedicated to Dámaso Rodríguez Martín, being the most successful reconstruction of the case. On this occasion, the reconstruction of the crimes was scripted and directed by Aaron J. Melián, with music by Raúl Capote.

See also
List of serial killers by country

References

External links
 Dámaso, "El Brujo" by El Moquinal.

1944 births
1991 suicides
20th-century Spanish criminals
Male serial killers
Spanish people convicted of murder
Spanish people convicted of rape
Spanish serial killers
Suicides by firearm in Spain
People convicted of murder by Spain
People convicted of theft
People from San Cristóbal de La Laguna